Three Who Paid is a 1923 American silent Western film film directed by Colin Campbell, and starring Dustin Farnum, with Bessie Love and Frank Campeau. The film was based on the 1922 short story by George Owen Baxter, and was produced and distributed through Fox Film.

The film is presumed lost.

Plot 
Riley Sinclair (Farnum) seeks to avenge the death of his brother, whose three companions – Quade, Sanderson, and Lowrie – left him to die in the desert. Two of the three men die, and the third is spared so that he can confess to the crime. Sinclair helps John Caspar (Love), a schoolteacher, who is actually a rich young woman who is trying to get away from her opportunist husband. When her identity is revealed, she and Sinclair fall in love.

Cast 
 Dustin Farnum as Riley Sinclair
 Bessie Love as Virginia Cartright / John Caspar
 Fred Kohler as Jim Quade
 Frank Campeau as Ed Sanderson
 Robert Daly as Sam Lowrie
 William Conklin as Jude Cartright
 Robert Agnew as Hal Sinclair

Production 
In November 1922, scenes were filmed in San Juan Canyon in Orange County, California. Production was delayed when Bessie Love, who was responsible for her own wardrobe, forgot to bring spirit gum to hold her wig, the prop man gave her LePage's glue, which adhered the wig to her head.

Release and reception 
The film was "a first rate production", but had issues. For the parts of the film when her character is masquerading as a man, Bessie Love was deemed unconvincing. Overall, the film received mixed reviews.

On its release, some theaters showed the film with the Baby Peggy short Nobody's Darling.

References 
Notes

Citations

Works cited

External links 

 
 
 

1923 Western (genre) films
1923 lost films
1923 films
American black-and-white films
Films based on short fiction
Films directed by Colin Campbell
Films shot in California
Fox Film films
Lost American films
Lost Western (genre) films
Melodrama films
Silent American Western (genre) films
Films with screenplays by Joseph F. Poland
1920s American films
Silent American drama films